Stříbrná Skalice is a municipality and village in Prague-East District in the Central Bohemian Region of the Czech Republic. It has about 1,500 inhabitants.

Administrative parts
Villages of Hradec, Hradové Střimelice and Kostelní Střimelice are administrative parts of Stříbrná Skalice.

Etymology
The name Stříbrná Skalice means "Silver Rock". The settlement was originally named Skalice hor stříbrných, i.e. "The Rock of Silver Mountains". The name reflects the long mining history of the settlement.

Geography
It lies on the right bank of the Sázava River. There are several ponds, including Hruškov and Propast ponds.

History
The first written mention of Skalice is from 1360. The first recorded owners were allegedly Ctibor of Skalice (1360–62), followed by Střížek of Skalice (1376), Kuneš of Skalice (1377), Ješek of Skalice (1384–92), Jan of Střímelice (1393) and Bohdal of Drahenice and Skalice (1402–03).

In 1403, Skalice passed over to King Wenceslaus IV whose burgrave in the Skalice Castle was Racek Kobyla of Dvorce. Later that year, Skalice was besieged by the army of King Sigismund, it was conquered and burned. Wenceslaus then donated Skalice to Jan Sokol of Vamberk in December 1403. In the years 1413–1415, Skalice was ruled by Kolman of Křikava, and then later became the property of the Sázava Monastery. In 1417, Stříbrná Skalice was first referred to as a market town.

In 1436, Sigismund pledged the town to Jan Zajímač of Kunštát, whose family it remained until 1567. However, due to the financial difficulties of the nobility, expansion of Stříbrná Skalice partially stopped several times in this period (1508 and 1528). In 1573, Jaroslav Smiřický bought the town for Václav, Kateřina and Markéta, orphans of his brother. Since then, it passed ownership several times and ended up being acquired by the Liechtensteins.

In 1715, the inhabitants of Skalice turned to the Duke of Savoy to build a new town hall at the municipal's expense, in order to restore the autonomy of the town and the granting of old privileges. On 23 October 1715, the request was confirmed by the nobility and in 1719 a new town hall was built. Stříbrná Skalice was also granted the privileges to hold markets on 3 March 1757.

Until 1865 there was no proper road leading to the market town, only forest roads and the surrounding fields. The first road connection was built in 1866 to Kostelec nad Černými lesy. Later, the construction of the Sázava railway was made between 1899–1901, on which regular transport began on 7 August 1901. The Pyskočely stop was renamed Stříbrná Skalice in 1903. However, the stop was on the other side of the Sázava river, so an iron truss bridge was made in 1946. The present day concrete bridge was built in the early 1970s.

The village of Rovná was integrated with Skalice in 1935, and Hradec, Hradové Střimelice and Kostelní Střimelice were merged in 1964. The areas of abandoned villages of Kozly and Přibyslavice also belongs to the municipality.

Silver mining
The municipality is connected with the silver mining that took place in surrounding areas in 15th and 16th century. The Skalice mines were the closest to Prague and gave impulse to the construction of a Prague mint during the reign of Ferdinand I (1526–1564). This event has become an important moment in the history of Skalice as a mining town. The oldest silver sealer from 1610 is stored in the Kolín State Archive.

In the 18th century the silver was depleted. In Stříbrná Skalice there are still preserved old mining shafts.

Sights

At the end of 12th century, the Church of Saint James the Great was constructed. It is a Romanesque church with a Baroque onion-shaped dome, dedicated to the patron of miners and located in the Rovná area. The second church is Church of Saint John of Nepomuk, built in the Baroque style in 1730.

In popular culture
The municipality features prominently in the video game Kingdom Come: Deliverance, developed by Czech studio Warhorse Studios and set during Sigismund's invasion of Bohemia. The town, known in-game as Skalitz, was then ruled by Racek Kobyla, falls victim to an army of Cumans loyal to King Sigismund. Rovná and Přibyslavice feature as villages separate from Skalice.

Notable people
Ladislav Štaidl (1945–2021), songwriter and musician

References

External links

 

Villages in Prague-East District